Za7ie is a multi-release musical project by French singer-songwriter Zazie. The project, themed by days of the week consists of seven titles per day of the week for a total of 42 new recordings.

Fifteen of the titles were released in an album, Za7ie on 20 September 2010. The remainder of the titles are to be released digitally in 7 EPs, every 8 days beginning 27 September 2010 until 22 November 2010, followed finally by a physical release of all 7 EPs as part of Za7ie: l'Intégrale on 29 November 2010.

The first release of the project was the fifteen-track album, Za7ie. It features a selection of songs from the 7 EPs, with the exception of En images.

Track listing

Charts

Weekly charts

Year-end charts

Ma quête

Monday's EP, Ma quête was released digitally on 27 September 2010.

En images

Tuesday's EP, En images was released digitally on 5 October 2010. This EP consists of tracks from the other six days, with accompanying videos. Consequently, this EP will be released in l'Intégrale, not as a CD but instead on DVD.

Les enfants

Wednesday's EP, Les enfants was released digitally on 13 October 2010.

Recyclage

Thursday's EP, Recyclage was released digitally on 21 October 2010.

Collectif

Friday's EP, Collectif was released digitally on 29 October 2010.

On Sort

Saturday's EP, On Sort was released digitally on 6 November 2010.

Relaxation

Sunday's EP, Relaxation was released digitally on 14 November 2010.

References

2010 albums
Zazie albums